Ponitz is a municipality in the district Altenburger Land, in Thuringia, Germany.

It is particularly famous for its Baroque organ by Gottfried Silbermann and for its spectacularly-eccentric Renaissance manor house. Districts of Ponitz are Zschöpel, Merlach, Guteborn and Grünberg.

References

Further reading
Home page of the Silbermann organ
Silbermann Museum
Silbermann: Geschichte und legende einer Orgelbauerfamilie (Ostfildern: Jan Thorbeck Verlag, 2006)
Ponitz Renaissanceschloss

Municipalities in Thuringia
Altenburger Land
Duchy of Saxe-Altenburg